Michel Berthenet is a French retired slalom canoeist who competed in the mid-1960s. He won a bronze medal in the mixed C-2 team event at the 1965 ICF Canoe Slalom World Championships in Spittal.

References

External links 
 Michel BERTHENET at CanoeSlalom.net

French male canoeists
Possibly living people
Year of birth missing (living people)
Medalists at the ICF Canoe Slalom World Championships